Weldon Howard "Weldy" Olson (born November 12, 1932 in Marquette, Michigan) is an American ice hockey player. He won a silver medal at the 1956 Winter Olympics and a gold medal at the 1960 Winter Olympics. In his Olympic career he played in 14 games and scored 7 goals.

Olson played hockey for the Michigan State Spartans from 1951 to 1955. He was team MVP, co-captain, and leading scorer. He played in 71 games and scored 125 points. He never missed a game at MSU.

Olson is a member of the MSU Hall of Fame, the U.P. Sports Hall of Fame, the Michigan Amateur Sports Hall of Fame, the Hancock County, Ohio, Sports Hall of Fame, Findlay Amateur Hockey Association Hall of Fame, the U.S. Olympic Hall of Fame, the US Hockey Hall of Fame, and in 2002 he received the Lester Patrick Award from the NHL for outstanding service to hockey in the United States. He currently resides in Findlay, Ohio.

References 
 
 Olson Brothers

1932 births
American men's ice hockey forwards
Ice hockey players at the 1956 Winter Olympics
Ice hockey players at the 1960 Winter Olympics
Olympic gold medalists for the United States in ice hockey
Olympic silver medalists for the United States in ice hockey
Ice hockey players from Michigan
Living people
Medalists at the 1956 Winter Olympics
Medalists at the 1960 Winter Olympics
People from Marquette, Michigan